Attorney General Wescott may refer to:

James Westcott (1802–1880), Attorney General of the Territory of Florida
James Westcott III (1839–1887), Attorney General of Florida